Midway is a ghost town in Johnson County, Iowa, United States. It does not currently have any standing structures and is private property.

History
Midway's population was 597 in 1902.

References

Geography of Johnson County, Iowa
Ghost towns in Iowa